The Rio de Janeiro Stock Exchange (Bolsa de Valores do Rio de Janeiro, or BVRJ) was Brazil's second largest exchange (after the Bovespa stock exchange in São Paulo), and was amongst the oldest of Brazilian stock exchanges. Its inauguration occurred on July 14, 1820, 3 years after the 1st Brazilian stock exchange inaugurated, the today inactive Salvador Exchange; and before the Brazilian Independence process began.

It was from its beginning through the early 1970s, the most important Brazilian Exchange. Following the 1971 markets crash's effects it slowly lost ground to São Paulo's Bovespa. After a national stock markets crash in 1989, BVRJ lost the rank of main stock exchange in Latin America to São Paulo's Exchange. Since, BVRJ traded in government bonds and currencies on the electronic Sisbex system, with the trading hours being from 10 a.m. to 4:45 p.m.

It was sold on April 11, 2002 to BM&F, which merged with Bovespa. It is now called the BM&FBovespa.

References

External links
 Bolsa de Valores de Rio de Janeiro website
 Naji Nahas Article of Wikipedia in  about the man who was the main character in the events that led to the breakdown of the Rio Stock Exchange in June, 1989

See also
List of stock exchanges
Bovespa (State of São Paulo Stock Exchange)
Brazilian Mercantile and Futures Exchange (BM&F)
Maringá Mercantile and Futures Exchange

Organisations based in Rio de Janeiro (city)
Stock exchanges in Brazil
Financial services companies of Brazil
Stock market crashes